Sadaf F. Jaffer (born February 19, 1983) is an American scholar and elected official who has represented the 16th Legislative District in the New Jersey General Assembly since taking office on January 11, 2022. She is a postdoctoral research associate at the Princeton Institute for International and Regional Studies.

Jaffer served two one-year terms as mayor of Montgomery Township, having taken office on January 3, 2019, and completing her term on December 31, 2020. She is the first woman of South Asian descent to serve as mayor of a town in New Jersey, and the first Muslim woman to serve as a mayor in the United States. Jaffer was first elected to Montgomery's Township Committee in 2017. She will not be seeking re-election in the 2023 New Jersey General Assembly election due to personal reasons.

Early life, family and education
Jaffer was born in Chicago to South Asian Muslim immigrants. Her mother was born in Pakistan and her father was born in Yemen. Her ancestors are originally from the Kutch region of western India. She attended the Latin School of Chicago, earned a bachelor's degree from the School of Foreign Service at Georgetown University, and a PhD at Harvard University.

In 2011, Jaffer married Daniel Sheffield, an assistant professor in the Near Eastern Studies department at Princeton. They had met at Harvard and have one child.

Mayor of Montgomery Township
In 2016, Jaffer launched an unsuccessful write-in campaign for Montgomery Township Committee. The following year she won a seat on the Township Committee on the Democratic ticket. In 2019, she was appointed to the position as mayor by her fellow committee members. She was sworn in on January 3, 2019, becoming the first woman of South Asian descent to serve as mayor of a town in New Jersey, and the first Muslim woman to serve as a mayor in the United States.

New Jersey General Assembly

Jaffer ran for New Jersey General Assembly in the 16th district after incumbent Andrew Zwicker decided to run for New Jersey State Senate. She was endorsed by several progressive groups, including #VOTEPROCHOICE. After trailing behind Republican Vinny Panico for the second Assembly seat by nearly 300 votes in data published the night of the election she won alongside Roy Freiman in the final results, more than 2,500 votes ahead of Panico.

Committees 
Committee assignments for the current session are:
Education
Health
State and Local Government

District 16 
Each of the 40 districts in the New Jersey Legislature has one representative in the New Jersey Senate and two members in the New Jersey General Assembly. The representatives from the 16th District for the 2022—23 Legislative Session are:
 Senator Andrew Zwicker  (D)
 Assemblyman Roy Freiman  (D)
 Assemblywoman Sadaf Jaffer  (D)

Electoral history

References

External links
 
 
 Princeton Institute for International and Regional Studies profile

1983 births
Living people
American people of Yemeni descent
Georgetown University alumni
Harvard University alumni
Democratic Party members of the New Jersey General Assembly
Politicians from Chicago
People from Montgomery Township, New Jersey
Politicians from Middlesex County, New Jersey
Princeton University people
Stanford University fellows
Women mayors of places in New Jersey
American Muslims
American politicians of Pakistani descent
Women state legislators in New Jersey
21st-century American politicians
21st-century American women politicians